Nación ESPN was a sports-related talk show, modeled after ESPN's Sportsnation TV series. It was hosted by three sports journalists in the Latino market, David Faitelson, Mauricio Pedroza and Pilar Pérez, who feature strong opinions, heated debates, celebrity interviews and heavy interaction with fans from all of the existing social media platforms.  The one-hour, Monday-thru-Friday show, is built around the fan and produced from the “L.A. Live” studios in HD. The show may establish Los Angeles as the Spanish language capital for ESPN.  It premiered on ESPN Deportes February 14, 2011. The show also began airing on ESPN for Mexico and Latin America since May 20, 2011.

The show was created by Ignacio Garcia, Coordinating Producer in charge of all TV Productions for ESPN Deportes and ESPN International originated from Los Angeles. The show received the EMMY Award for Outstanding Sports TV Show in 2014. The same year, Garcia also expanded the brand with Nación ESPN Fin de Semana, the weekend version that shows the Top 50 best and worst plays of the week.

Garcia also launched the English-language version of the program airing on ESPN2 on Monday, September 26. 
The one-hour afternoon interactive sports talk show is targeting bilingual U.S. Hispanic sports fans.
“Nación ESPN” on ESPN2 is hosted by three Latino commentators: Jorge Sedano, co-host of ESPNLA’s Mornings with Keyshawn and Jorge and LZ, Bernardo Osuna, ESPN’s bilingual boxing reporter and host of ESPN Deportes’ A Los Golpes, and baseball expert Marly Rivera.
The show airs live at 5 p.m. ET on Mondays from ESPN’s studios in Los Angeles.
The show leverages the crossover that exists between the programs, connecting the ESPN and ESPN Deportes audiences.

The show ended its run on December 21, 2018 and was replaced by Ahora o Nunca, a Spanish-language version of ESPN2's Now or Never.

Notable segments

Ask the Professional
A celebrity has to answer five sports and general knowledge questions in 300 seconds. If the answer is correct the clock stops. If the answer is wrong 60 seconds are taken off the clock. The time left will show how much they know.

Did You Hear That?

Sport-related sound bites of sports figures saying something humorous or outrageous.

Gotcha!

Players caught on tape with hidden cameras during a practical joke or a funny situation.

Weird Web Stories

Unusual and often not sports related videos from the Internet.  Last video will be paused in the middle so the co-hosts can guess what will happen next.

Montage of Soundbites

Montage of different sound bites from sports personalities pretending that are reacting to a specific topic.

The Skinny Lady and The Fat Man

Tabloid-like TV entertainment news segment that will cover the glamorous side of athletes.

3 Cheers/Jeers/Tears

The good, bad, and embarrassing  plays of the day.

The Best of ESPN
The best and funniest moments from the different shows of ESPN International.

Fan Involvement 

Sports fans will find Nación ESPN as the place to express their opinions and interact with the co-hosts thru online forums, poll questions, YouTube, Tweets, SMS and even as part of a live audience in the studio

Fan-related segments
What would you do? Fans will say what would they do if they were in the shoes of a famous player or coach.
Pulse of the Nation Top 5 tweets of the day.
Who knows more? Camera asks people questions about current sports news and other topics in public areas showing the most outrageously, incorrect answers.
Pictures from fans  Fans displaying their crazy passion about sports and teams.
Funny videos from viewers  Fans displaying some sport ability or trick.

Celebrity guest appearances
Each night, a high-profile athlete, actor, singer, comedian or Latino public figure will be interviewed and involved in the different segments of the show.  The interview questions will focus on the interviewee's passion for sports, comical stories about their careers, and stories of the day in sports. 
Showing different sides of a celebrity's persona, the show will end each segment with some sort of a competition between the co-host(s) and the guest.  This activities will range from foosball competitions to basketball shootouts.

Focus on technology
This show will be driven by the involvement of fans, the hosts, and technology, making it one of the most interactive and dynamic shows in television.  Thanks to the use of the latest technology available such as touch screen monitors, virtual graphics and web walls, the technology enhancement will provide a unique angle to the show, something totally unprecedented in Hispanic television.
Nación ESPN will be the meeting place for sports entertainment and new technology on ESPN Deportes.

On-air staff

Nación ESPN English-language version
Jorge Sedano (2016–2018)
Marly Rivera (2016–2018)
Bernardo Osuna (2016–2018)

Nación ESPN Spanish-language version
David Faitelson (2011–2018)
Rosy Martell (2015)
Adriana Monsalve (2011–2014)
Mauricio Pedroza (2015–2018)
Pilar Pérez (2016–2018)

See also
SportsNation (TV series) - Original

References

External links
Sports Nation
ESPNDeportes.com
ESPNLA.com
 

American sports television series
Spanish-language television programming in the United States